Majineh (also Romanized as Majīneh; also known as Madzhainak and Majāinah) is a village in Zanjanrud-e Bala Rural District, in the Central District of Zanjan County, Zanjan Province, Iran. At the 2006 census, its population was 366, in 88 families.

References 

Populated places in Zanjan County